Howard Richards may refer to:

Howard Richards (academic) (born 1938), American social scientist
Howard Richards (American football) (born 1959), NFL player